Eisberg Head  is a headland consisting of steep cliffs marked by rocky exposures, located just west of the mouth of Vane Glacier on the coast of Marie Byrd Land in Antarctica. 

The headland is the northern extremity of a mountainous ridge descending from the central part of the Mount Murphy massif. It was mapped by the United States Geological Survey from surveys and U.S. Navy air photos, 1959–66, and was named by the Advisory Committee on Antarctic Names for Commander (later Captain) Harry B. Eisberg, a U.S. Navy Staff Medical Officer on Operation Highjump, 1946–47.

References 

Headlands of Marie Byrd Land